Threshold may refer to:

Architecture
 Threshold (door), the sill of a door

Literature
 Threshold (1990 novel), a science fiction novel by Chris and Janet Morris
 Threshold (Sara Douglass novel), a fantasy novel
 Threshold (Palmer novel), a science fiction novel by David R. Palmer
 Threshold, the first volume of the collected short fiction of Roger Zelazny
 Threshold (DC Comics), a comic book published by DC Comics
 Threshold (Doctor Who), an organization in Doctor Who comic strips
 Threshold, a science-fiction novel by Caitlín R. Kiernan
 Threshold, a Christian novel by Bill Myers
 Threshold, a science-fiction novel by Ben Mezrich
 Threshold Editions, a conservative imprint

Media
 Threshold (1981 film)
 Threshold, a 2008 film directed by Deepak Rauniyar
 Threshold (TV series), an American science fiction drama series produced during 2005-2006
 "Threshold" (Stargate SG-1), an episode of the TV series
 "Threshold" (Star Trek: Voyager), an episode of the TV series
 Threshold Entertainment, a Hollywood Intellectual Property Management and Production Company
 Threshold Podcast, a podcast focused on long-form reporting of climate justice topics

Music
 Threshold (band), a UK progressive metal band
 Threshold House, a record label created by Coil
 Threshold Records, a record label created by The Moody Blues

Albums
 Threshold (album), a 2006 album by HammerFall 
 Thresholds (album), a 1992 album by Nocturnus
 Threshold, a 1997 album by Erik Norlander

Songs
 "Threshold", by Pocahaunted, 2010
 "Threshold", by Slayer on the album God Hates Us All, 2001
 "Threshold", by The Steve Miller Band from Book of Dreams, 1977
 "Threshold", by Turnover from Peripheral Vision, 2015
 "Threshold," from the Scott Pilgrim vs. the World soundtrack, 2010
 "The Threshold", by Connie Smith from Connie Smith, 1965

Science

Biology

 Threshold (reference value)
 Absolute threshold
 Absolute threshold of hearing
 Action potential
 Aerobic threshold
 Anaerobic threshold
 Dark adaptation threshold
 Epidemic threshold
 Flicker fusion threshold
 Masking threshold
 Odor detection threshold
 Renal threshold
 Seizure threshold
 Sensory threshold
 Threshold expression
 Threshold limit value
 Threshold model
 Threshold of pain
 Threshold potential

Other science-related

 Ecological threshold
 Error threshold (evolution)
 Extinction threshold
 Lasing threshold
 Percolation threshold
 Polygyny threshold model
 Threshold cryptosystem
 Threshold displacement energy
 Threshold energy
 Threshold graph
 Threshold knowledge
 Threshold model
 Threshold value
 Threshold voltage
 Thresholding (image processing)
 Transparency threshold

Other uses
 Threshold (video game), a 1981 video game
 Threshold Audio, a manufacturer of high end audio amplifiers
 Displaced threshold, an aviation term
 Election threshold, a concept in voting systems
 Poverty thresholds (United States Census Bureau)
In government procurement, the expenditure value which determines which rules and procedures are to be applied to a proposed purchase

See also